Buchanan Township may refer to:
Buchanan Township, Jefferson County, Iowa
Buchanan Township, Page County, Iowa
Buchanan Township, Michigan
Buchanan Township, Atchison County, Missouri

Township name disambiguation pages